Okfuskee County is a county located in the U.S. state of Oklahoma. As of the 2010 census, its population was 12,191. Its county seat is Okemah. The county is named for a former Muscogee town in present Cleburne County, Alabama, that in turn was named for the Okfuskee, a Muscogee tribe.

History

The area now covered by Okfuskee County was occupied by the Quapaw and Osage tribes until 1825, when they ceded the land to the United States government. The Creeks moved here in the early 1830s and built two towns, Greenleaf and Thlopthlocco. During the Civil War, Thlopthlocco served as headquarters for Confederate Col. Douglas H. Cooper. Greenleaf was where Chief Opothleyahola camped while he tried to retain unity among the Creeks, before leading over 5000 Creeks to Kansas to avoid the war.

After the war, the Creeks were required to free their African American slaves. Many of these people remained in the same area and founded all-black communities. These towns included Boley, Bookertee, Clearview, Chilesville, and Rusk. Okfuskee, a Creek town, grew up around Samuel Checote's trading post after the Civil War.

The St. Louis and San Francisco Railway built a north–south line through this area during 1901–03. The Fort Smith and Western Railroad constructed an east–west line in 1903.

Okfuskee County was created at statehood from the former Creek Nation, and Okemah was designated as the county seat. Oil and gas production began in the county in 1914, when the Prairie Oil and Gas Company completed a well near Paden. Other wells followed elsewhere in the county, creating a population boom that peaked in 1930.

Geography
The county lies within the Sandstone Hills physiographic region. The northeastern part is drained by the Deep Fork of the Canadian River, while the southern part is drained by the  North Canadian River.

Major highways
  Interstate 40
  U.S. Highway 62
  U.S. Highway 75
  State Highway 48
  State Highway 56

Adjacent counties
 Creek County (north)
 Okmulgee County (east)
 McIntosh County (southeast)
 Hughes County (south)
 Seminole County (southwest)
 Pottawatomie County (southwest)
 Lincoln County (west)

Demographics

As of the 2010 United States Census, there were 12,191 people living in the county. 64.4% were White, 19.7% Native American, 8.3% Black or African American, 0.2% Asian, 0.1% Pacific Islander, 0.8% of some other race and 6.5% of two or more races. 2.9% were Hispanic or Latino (of any race).

As of the census of 2000, there were 11,814 people, 4,270 households, and 2,971 families living in the county.  The population density was 7/km2 (19/mi2).  There were 5,114 housing units at an average density of 3/km2 (8/mi2).  The racial makeup of the county was 65.46% White, 10.41% Black or African American, 18.20% Native American, 0.08% Asian, 0.57% from other races, and 5.27% from two or more races.  1.64% of the population were Hispanic or Latino of any race. 92.5% spoke English, 3.5% Muskogee, 2.1% Spanish and 1.3% German as their first language.

There were 4,270 households, out of which 29.20% had children under the age of 18 living with them, 54.10% were married couples living together, 11.20% had a female householder with no husband present, and 30.40% were non-families. 27.80% of all households were made up of individuals, and 14.50% had someone living alone who was 65 years of age or older.  The average household size was 2.52 and the average family size was 3.06.

In the county, the population was spread out, with 24.60% under the age of 18, 8.20% from 18 to 24, 26.70% from 25 to 44, 24.20% from 45 to 64, and 16.30% who were 65 years of age or older.  The median age was 39 years. For every 100 females there were 106.50 males.  For every 100 females age 18 and over, there were 107.90 males.

The median income for a household in the county was $24,324, and the median income for a family was $30,325. Males had a median income of $24,129 versus $17,819 for females. The per capita income for the county was $12,746.  About 17.30% of families and 23.00% of the population were below the poverty line, including 29.60% of those under age 18 and 17.50% of those age 65 or over.

Life expectancy and health
Of 3,142 counties in the United States in 2014, the Institute for Health Metrics and Evaluation ranked Okfuskee County 2,986 in the life expectancy at birth of male residents and 3,091 in the life expectancy of female residents. Males in Okfuskee County lived an average of 70.8 years and females lived an average of 75.7 years compared to the national life expectancy of 76.7 for males and 81.5 for females. In the 1980-2014 period, the average life expectancy in Okfuskee County for females decreased by 1.3 years while male longevity increased by 1.9 years compared to the national average for the same period of an increased life expectancy of 4.0 years for women and 6.7 years for men. Okfuskee was one of only a few counties in the United States to suffer a decline in life expectancy for women between 1980 and 2014.

In 2020, the Robert Wood Johnson Foundation ranked Okfuskee country as number 73 of 77 counties in Oklahoma in "health outcomes," as measured by length and quality of life.

Politics

Communities

 Bearden
 Boley
 Castle
 Clearview
 IXL
 Last Chance
 Mason
 Okemah
 Paden
 Pharoah
 Weleetka
 Welty

NRHP sites

The following sites in Okfuskee County are listed on the National Register of Historic Places:
 Boley Historic District, Boley
 Okemah Armory, Okemah
 Okfuskee County Courthouse, Okemah
 Weleetka Town Hall and Jail, Weleetka

In popular culture
Okfuskee was the home county of American folk icon Woody Guthrie, who was born in Okemah. Guthrie refers to Okfuskee in one of his lost lyrics, "Way Over Yonder In the Minor Key." The lyrics were set to music by Billy Bragg and Wilco for their 1998 collaboration, Mermaid Avenue.

See also
 Lynching of Laura and L.D. Nelson

References

 
1907 establishments in Oklahoma
Populated places established in 1907